"C" (stylized as "「C」") is the debut single by Japanese entertainer Miho Nakayama. Written by Takashi Matsumoto and Kyōhei Tsutsumi, the single was released on June 21, 1985, by King Records.

Background and release
Aside from being her debut single, "C" marked the beginning of her collaboration with songwriters Matsumoto and Tsutsumi, who went on to write songs on her first four albums. The song was used as the opening theme of the TBS drama series , which starred Nakayama.

"C" peaked at No. 12 on Oricon's weekly singles chart and sold over 170,000 copies. The song earned Nakayama the Best New Artist award at the 27th Japan Record Awards and the Best Newcomer Award at the 23rd Golden Arrow Awards.

Nakayama self-covered the song on her 2019 album Neuf Neuf.

Track listing
All lyrics are written by Takashi Matsumoto; all music is arranged by Mitsuo Hagita.

Charts
Weekly charts

Year-end charts

References

External links

1985 debut singles
1985 songs
Japanese-language songs
Japanese television drama theme songs
Miho Nakayama songs
Songs with lyrics by Takashi Matsumoto (lyricist)
Songs with music by Kyōhei Tsutsumi
King Records (Japan) singles